Cyril Victor Suares (2 June 1888 – 18 April 1966) was  a former Australian rules footballer who played with Collingwood in the Victorian Football League (VFL).

Notes

External links 
		
Cyril Suares's profile at Collingwood Forever

1888 births
1966 deaths
Australian rules footballers from Melbourne
Collingwood Football Club players
Minyip Football Club players
People from West Melbourne, Victoria